José Narosky (born 20 April 1930 in Darregueira, Province of Buenos Aires) is an Argentine notary public and writer, mainly of aphorisms.

Early life 
The son of immigrants (a Lithuanian father, Ukrainian mother), Narosky was born in 1930 in Darregueira, a rural area of the province of Buenos Aires. He has three siblings: Adelino (writer and humorist), Tito (ornithologist) and Lila. His interest in aphorisms began in childhood, through his father who wrote notes on the back of his cigarettes packets, which little Narosky collected.

Published books 
1975 "Si todos los hombres" (in 2007 there were 32 editions, with more than 670,000 copies sold).
1992 "Ecos"
1993 "Brisas".
1993 "Si todos los sueños..."
1993 "Sendas"
1997 "Si todos los tiempos..."
2001 "Luces"
2003 "Sembremos...".
2006 "Aforismos, libro de oro".

Awards and honours 
 José Hernández Prize for Literature, for the book "Si todos los hombres...".
 Honor Gaza Sociedad Argentina de Escritores (SADE), for the book "Si todos los hombres...".
 Distinction of the Legislature of the City of Buenos Aires for his work.
 Award for literary work from the Legislature of the Province of Buenos Aires.
 Distinction of the municipality of La Plata, for his valuable contribution to culture.

References
Article on Clarin.com (in Spanish)

1930 births
Living people
Jewish Argentine writers
Argentine people of Lithuanian-Jewish descent
Argentine people of Ukrainian-Jewish descent